Horace Hart (16 August 1894–1975) was an English footballer who played in the Football League for Nottingham Forest.

References

1894 births
1975 deaths
English footballers
Association football forwards
English Football League players
Nottingham Forest F.C. players
Stalybridge Celtic F.C. players